Fräulein Veronika is a 1936 Austrian-Swiss comedy film directed by Veit Harlan and starring Thekla Ahrens, Carl Esmond and Hans Moser. It is based on the play Veronika by Fritz Peter Buch. The film is sometimes known by the alternative title Alles für Veronika.

Main cast
 Thekla Ahrens - Veronika Sonntag 
 Carl Esmond - Paul Schmidt 
 Hans Moser - Direktor Tutzinger 
 Theo Lingen - Abteilungschef Fuchs 
 Walter Janssen - Abteilungschef Wolf 
 Grethe Weiser - Annie Hegemann 
 Gretl Theimer - Lizzie 
 Hilde Hildebrand - Dora 
 Hubert von Meyerinck - Theo 
 Clemens Hasse - Hausdetektiv Krüger 
 Paul Beckers - Portier Kulicke 
 Ilse Fürstenberg - Frau Kulicke 
 Georg Erich Schmidt - Pickelberg 
 Hilli Wildenhain - Hänschen

Bibliography
 Bergfelder, Tim & Bock, Hans-Michael. ''The Concise Cinegraph: Encyclopedia of German. Berghahn Books, 2009.

External links

1936 films
Austrian comedy films
Swiss comedy films
1930s German-language films
Films directed by Veit Harlan
Austrian films based on plays
Swiss black-and-white films
Austrian black-and-white films